Yury Kurbyko (born 26 February 1956) is a retired Belarusian professional football player. He spent his playing career in Dinamo Minsk and Pakhtakor Tashkent.

In 1991, he was named a Belarusian Footballer of the Year coming only second after Viktor Hryshko in the most "clean sheets" matches run-up. After retirement he started his own business and worked for Football Federation of Belarus.

Honours
Dinamo Minsk
 Soviet Top League champion: 1982
 Belarusian Premier League champion: 1992, 1992–93
 Belarusian Cup winner: 1992

Individual
 Belarusian Footballer of the Year: 1991

References

1956 births
Living people
Soviet footballers
Belarusian footballers
Association football goalkeepers
Soviet Top League players
FC Dinamo Minsk players
Belarusian Premier League players
Pakhtakor Tashkent FK players
Footballers from Minsk